The 2011 Colorado Ice season was the team's fifth season as a football franchise and third in the Indoor Football League (IFL). Founded for the 2007 season as part of United Indoor Football, the Colorado Ice became charter members of the IFL when the UIF merged with the Intense Football League before the 2009 season. One of 22 teams that competed in the IFL for the 2011 season, the Fort Collins-based Colorado Ice were members of the Mountain West Division of the Intense Conference.

In their final season under original head coach Collins Sanders, the Colorado Ice played their home games at the Budweiser Events Center in Loveland, Colorado. The team recorded an 11–3 record, won the Mountain West Division title, and reached the playoffs.

Schedule
Key:

Preseason

Regular season

Postseason

Standings

Awards and honors
On March 23, the Indoor Football League named running back Terry Washington as its offensive player of the week. The league cited his four-touchdown effort in the team's win over the Wenatchee Valley Venom in making the award.

On April 6, the Indoor Football League named defensive back Tyrone King its defensive player of the week. The league cited his "clutch performance" in Colorado's victory over the Bricktown Brawlers.

References

External links
 Colorado Ice official statistics
 2011 IFL regular season schedule

Colorado Ice
Colorado Crush (IFL)
Colorado Ice